Ordinary Angels is an upcoming American drama film directed by Jon Gunn and starring Hilary Swank, Alan Ritchson, Emily Mitchell, and Nancy Travis.  It is set for release on October 13, 2023.

Premise
Inspired by the incredible true story of a hairdresser who single-handedly rallies an entire community to help a widowed father save the life of his critically ill young daughter while the community is hit by a major snowstorm from the 1994 North American cold wave.

Cast
Hilary Swank as Sharon Stevens
Alan Ritchson as Ed Schmitt
Skywalker Hughes
Nancy Travis
Tamala Jones
Emily Mitchell
Drew Powell
Amy Acker

Production
In March 2022, the film was officially announced with Swank and Ritchson staring, with Jon Gunn directing and writing the most recent draft of the script with Jon Erwin. Meg Tilly and Kelly Fremon Craig contributed an earlier draft. Filming occurred in Winnipeg in April 2022, and Albany, New York in June 2022.

References

External links
 

Upcoming films
2023 films
American drama films
Films shot in Winnipeg
Lionsgate films
Films shot in New York (state)